Torrieri is an Italian surname. Notable people with the surname include:

 Diana Torrieri (1913–2007), Italian actress
 Don Torrieri, American author, electrical engineer, and mathematician
 Marco Torrieri (born 1978), Italian sprinter
 Raúl Torrieri (born 1944), Uruguayan rower

Italian-language surnames